Holcocerus reticuliferus is a moth in the family Cossidae. It is found in Uzbekistan.

References

Natural History Museum Lepidoptera generic names catalog

Cossinae
Moths described in 1949
Moths of Asia